Municipalities (municipios in Spanish) are the second-level administrative divisions of Mexico, where the first-level administrative division is the state (Spanish: estado). They should not be confused with cities or towns that may share the same name as they are distinct entities and do not share geographical boundaries.  As of January 2021, there are 2,454 municipalities in Mexico, excluding the 16 boroughs of Mexico City.

Since the 2015 Intercensal Survey, two municipalities have been created in Campeche, three in Chiapas, three in Morelos, one in Quintana Roo  and one in Baja California. 

Structure

All Mexican states are divided into municipalities. Each municipality is autonomous; citizens elect a "municipal president" (presidente municipal) who heads a municipal council (ayuntamiento), responsible for providing all the public services for their constituents. This concept, which originated after the Mexican Revolution, is known as a municipio libre ("free municipality"). 

The municipal president is elected by plurality and cannot be reelected for the next immediate term. The municipal council consists of a cabildo (chairman) with a síndico and several regidores (trustees).

If the municipality covers a large area and contains more than one city or town (collectively called localidades), one city or town is selected as a cabecera municipal (head city, seat of the municipal government) while the rest elect representatives to a presidencia auxiliar or junta auxiliar (auxiliary presidency or council). In that sense, a municipality in Mexico is roughly equivalent to the counties of the United States, whereas the auxiliary presidency is equivalent to a township. Nonetheless, auxiliary presidencies are not considered a third-level administrative division since they depend fiscally on the municipalities in which they are located.

North-western and south-eastern states are divided into small numbers of large municipalities (e.g. Baja California is divided into only seven municipalities), and therefore they cover large areas incorporating several separated cities or towns that do not necessarily conform to one single conurbation. Central and southern states, on the other hand, are divided into many small municipalities (e.g. Oaxaca is divided into 570 municipalities), and therefore large urban areas usually extend over several municipalities which form one single conurbation. Although an urban area might cover an entire municipality, auxiliary councils might still be used for administrative purposes.

Municipalities are responsible for public services (such as water and sewerage), street lighting, public safety, traffic, supervision of slaughterhouses and the cleaning and maintenance of public parks, gardens and cemeteries. They may also assist the state and federal governments in education, emergency fire and medical services, environmental protection and maintenance of monuments and historical landmarks. Since 1983, they can collect property taxes and user fees, although more funds are obtained from the state and federal governments than from their own collection efforts.

Some municipalities in Mexico are subdivided into internal, third-level administrative organizations. All municipalities of Baja California are subdivided into boroughs, or delegaciones. Mexicali municipality, for example, is divided into 14 boroughs besides the City of Mexicali, which comprises the municipal seat and three additional metropolitan boroughs. Querétaro municipality is subdivided into seven boroughs. Nonetheless, the heads of government of the boroughs are not elected by the residents but rather appointed by the municipal president.

Mexico City is a special case in that it is not organized into municipalities. As a result of the Political Reforms enacted in 2016, it is no longer designated as a Federal District and became a city, a member entity of the Mexican federation, seat of the Powers of the Union and the capital of Mexico. Mexico City is divided in 16 boroughs, officially called demarcaciones territoriales, substituting the old delegaciones. The boroughs are considered as third-level territorial divisions for statistical data collection and cross-country comparisons.

History

Since the Conquest and colonization of Mexico, the municipality became the basic entity of the administrative organization of  New Spain and the Spanish Empire. Settlements located in strategic locations received the status of ciudad (the highest status within the Empire, superior to that of villas and pueblos) and were entitled to form an ayuntamiento or municipality. During the first decades, the local authorities had full powers on the public and economic administration of each municipality, but successive reforms diminished their attributions.

After Independence, the 1824 Constitution did not specify any regulation for the municipalities, whose structure and responsibilities were to be outlined in the constitution of each state of the federation. As such, every state set its own requirements for a settlement to become a municipality (usually based on population). 

The Constitution of 1917 abolished the jefatura política ("political authority"), the intermediate administrative authority between the states and converted all existing municipalities into municipios libres ("free municipalities"), that is, gave them full autonomy to manage local affairs, while at the same time restricting the scope of their competencies. However, in 1983 the 115th article was modified to expand the municipalities' authority to raise revenue (through property taxes and other local services) and to  formulate budgets.

The first city council in Mexico was established by Hernán Cortés in 1519 in Veracruz; it was also the first in the American mainland.  The newest municipalities in Mexico are Honduras de la Sierra, incorporated on July 15, 2018; Coatetelco, Hueyapan and Xoxocotla, created on January 1, 2019; San Quintín, established on February 27, 2020; and Seybaplaya and Dzitbalché, gazetted on January 1, 2021.

Ranking of municipalities

By population

Data from the 2020 Mexican National Census.

By area

Data from the 2020 Mexican National Census.

By location
 Northernmost: Mexicali, Baja California
 Southernmost: Suchiate, Chiapas 
 Westernmost: Ensenada, Baja California
 Easternmost: Isla Mujeres, Quintana Roo
 Geographical center: Villa de Cos, Zacatecas
 Highest: Tlachichuca, Puebla and Calcahualco, Veracruz (5,636 m, Citlaltépetl volcano).
 Lowest: Mexicali, Baja California (-12 m, Laguna Salada).

See also
 Settlement classification in Mexico
 Boroughs of Mexico

References

External links
Mexican government structure
History  of the Mexican constitution
Mexico Portal de Información Municipal 

 
Local government in Mexico
Subdivisions of Mexico
Mexico 2
Municipalities, Mexico
Urban planning in Mexico